Levitt Luzern Custer  (July 27, 1888 – August 30, 1962) was the inventor of the statoscope and early motorized wheelchair, called the Custer chair.

Biography
He was born in Dayton, Ohio on July 27, 1888 to Levitt Ellsworth Custer. He graduated from Otterbein University in 1909 and then the Massachusetts Institute of Technology in 1913. His first patented invention was the statoscope which showed whether an aerostat was ascending or descending. Custer produced the device for the United States Navy at his factory, Custer Specialty Company, on North Ludlow Street in Dayton, Ohio. He invented a motorized wheelchair in 1919.

He died on August 30, 1962 in Dayton, Ohio.

Legacy
His papers are archived at Wright State University.

References

People from Dayton, Ohio
1888 births
1962 deaths
Oberlin College alumni
Massachusetts Institute of Technology alumni
Members of the Early Birds of Aviation